Osamu Suzuki may refer to:

, Japanese businessman
, Japanese ceramist
, Japanese television writer and screenwriter